This article contains the results of the 1968 Iranian local elections.

Results 
Source: Ministry of Interior

References 

Election results in Iran